Vanda coerulea, commonly known as blue orchid, blue vanda or autumn lady's tresses, is a species of orchid found in  Northeast India with its range extending to China (southern Yunnan). It is known as kwaklei in Manipuri and vandaar in Sanskrit. It has bluish purple flowers (Thelymitra crinita is the only orchid that has true blue flowers) which are very long-lasting compared to other orchids. The plant bears up to 20 to 30 spikes.

Medicinal uses
The flower's juice is used as eye drops against glaucoma, cataract and blindness.
Active ingredients of Vanda coerulea may fight against the visible signs of ageing skin.

References

External links
 
 

coerulea
Orchids of Assam
Orchids of Yunnan